The Marriage is a 2017 Kosovan romantic drama film directed by Blerta Zeqiri. It was selected as the Kosovan entry for the Best Foreign Language Film at the 91st Academy Awards, but it was not nominated.

Plot
In the lead-up to Bekim and Anita's wedding, Bekim's friend and former gay lover, Nol, returns from abroad.

Cast
 Alban Ukaj as Bekim
 Adriana Matoshi as Anita
 Genc Salihu as Nol

Reception
On Rotten Tomatoes, it has a 75% score based on 8 critics, with an average rating of 8/10.

See also
 List of submissions to the 91st Academy Awards for Best Foreign Language Film
 List of Kosovan submissions for the Academy Award for Best Foreign Language Film

References

External links
 

2017 films
2017 drama films
2017 romance films
2017 romantic drama films
Kosovan romance films
Kosovan romantic drama films
2017 LGBT-related films
Kosovan drama films
Albanian-language films
Gay-related films
LGBT-related drama films
Male bisexuality in film
Films set in Kosovo